Laird plc was a leading British-based electronics and technology business. It was listed on the London Stock Exchange until it was acquired by Advent International in July 2018.

History
The company was founded by John Laird in 1824 as Birkenhead Ironworks in Birkenhead, Wirral. In 1903 it merged with Charles Cammell & Company Limited and, as Cammell Laird, went on to build numerous ships for the Royal Navy. In 1976 its transport division, which traded as Metro-Cammell, secured a major order to build mass transit railway carriages for the Hong Kong Mass Transit System.

In 1977 its shipbuilding business was nationalised and in 1989 it disposed of its mass transit railway activities. In the 1980s it moved into security products and in the 1990s into electronics. In 2000 it disposed of its automotive industry activities and more recently, in 2007, it disposed of its security business to Lupus Capital. In 2008 it changed its name from Laird Group PLC to Laird PLC.

More recently the company has expanded in electronics with acquisitions such as Wisconsin based LS Research in November 2015 and German based Novero in December 2015.

In March 2018 Advent International made an offer for the company valuing at £1 billion. The transaction was completed in July 2018.

Operations

The company's has operations organised as follows:
 Performance Materials
 Wireless and Thermal Systems
 Connected Vehicle Solutions

References

External links
 Official site
 Lairdtech.com

Defunct companies based in London
1824 establishments in England
Manufacturing companies established in 1824
British companies established in 1824